School No. 263 is located in Otradnoye District, North-Eastern Administrative Okrug, Moscow and has high school-level students.

The 2014 Moscow school shooting occurred there on February 3, 2014.

References

External links

School No. 263 

Schools in Moscow